Păltinei River may refer to several rivers in Romania:

Păltinei, a tributary of the Râul Mare in Alba County
Păltinei, a tributary of the Scărișoara in Gorj County
Păltinei, a tributary of the Tismana in Gorj County